Dhaka fire may refer to the following:

 2010 Dhaka fire
 2012 Dhaka garment factory fire
 February 2019 Dhaka fire
 FR Tower fire, in March 2019